James Bruce Irwin (17 November 1921 – 4 January 2012) was a New Zealand botanist.

Biography
Bruce Irwin was born in 1921 in Whanganui. He fell in love with orchids in New Zealand, and attended Whanganui Technical College there. When World War II began, he was 17 years old and was working at the survey department in New Plymouth. He and his friend Sid Gibson used to collect and draw orchids in nearby Egmont National Park. Despite his military service and a year spent in occupied Japan, he carried out a great deal of work with Sid's son Owen Gibson on Mount Taranaki and executed a number of orchid watercolors during the war and in the immediate postwar period.

Irwin later worked for the Cartographic Branch of the Department of Lands and Survey, where his paintings came to the attention of the botanist Lucy Moore. He quit the Cartographic Branch in 1962 and went to live at his camp in Marlborough Sounds. A collaboration with Moore began, which resulted in his illustrating Volume II of the Flora of New Zealand (1970) and The Oxford Book of New Zealand Plants (1978).

By the 1970s, he had taken a part-time job in the Art Department of Otago Medical School. He largely abandoned watercolors for large-scale pencil drawings, which he felt better illustrated botanical points. After 11.5 years of work on illustrations for The Oxford Book of New Zealand Plants, he retired from his job to pursue orchid cultivation in Tauranga.

In 1986 he did some illustrations for Clarkson's Vegetation of Egmont National Park and in 2007, Brian Tyler published a book of his drawings. During the last years of his life, he cultivated orchids at the Te Puna Quarry Park. He received a number of botanical awards, and a species of Pterostylis was named after him, Pterostylis irwinii.

References

1921 births
2012 deaths
20th-century New Zealand botanists
New Zealand military personnel of World War II
New Zealand expatriates in Japan